Navyug School, often referred to as a school for gifted children, is an experimental school for the talented children  . It was founded in 1973 by New Delhi Municipal Council (NDMC) under the auspices of Navyug School Education Society.

The first of the 11 branches is in Sarojini Nagar, New Delhi. The first principal of the school was J. N. Dar, an Eton college alumnus. After the success of this school, NDMC opened 10 more branches in Delhi. All branches are run by Navyug School Education Society and funded by NDMC.

The selection of students is through a stringent written test followed by an interview. The students and the teachers go through a rigorous screening procedure, making these schools at par with any good private school in India. Its recent branch opened in Mandir Marg.

Navyug School at Sarojini Nagar has 1200 students on its roll, and the demand for admission is increasing each passing year. The students are provided with facilities like free meals, stationery and uniforms.

Navyug has a long list of successful former pupils, including:

 Shankar Jiwal, IPS https://www.tn.gov.in/detail_contact/6946/4/
 Professor Piyush Sharma, PhD https://staffportal.curtin.edu.au/staff/profile/view/Piyush.Sharma/
 Vivekanand Sharma, Physician MD, Internal Medicine, Biochemistry, https://www.southcoast.org/doctors/vivekanand-sharma-md/

Philosophy and objective 

Rich or poor, education is a fundamental right of all. Educated masses are the foundation of a developed country. At the time of independence, there were few private schools but only rich could afford them. Government schools provided cheap education, but their standard was far below that of private schools.

Intelligence is not a function of wealth but it is required to mine and process the reserves of raw intelligence. Latent talent from economically weaker section generally goes waste in absence of resources. To harness this untapped potential, New Delhi Municipal Council (NDMC) formed Navyug School Education Society, which started the first Navyug School in 1973 at Sarojini Nagar, Delhi. The school is brain-child of Smt. Vidyaben Shah, who was then vice president of NDMC. The school is often quoted as a "school for gifted children".

References

External links 
 www.navayug.com: Site created by Ex-Students of Sarojini Nagar, Delhi
 Navyug Schools celebrate 42nd foundation day in New Delhi

Special schools in India
Schools in Delhi